The Pogue House is a historic house in Maysville, Kentucky. It was built in 1845 on a fifteen-acre lot for industrialist Michael Ryan. The property was named "Riverside" by Ryan since it sits on a hillside with a sweeping  vista of the Ohio River. The property was subdivided in 1955 and the historic portion currently comprises three acres. The Greek Revival floor plan includes three stories of living space two rooms wide and two rooms deep with a center hall plus a partial basement.

The residence was purchased by Henry E. Pogue II and significantly upgraded circa 1890. Improvements included the installation of three sets of pocket doors and quarter sawn flooring on the first level. One of the first bathrooms in Mason County was installed on the second floor. The terrace deteriorated over time and was eventually demolished.

Henry Pogue was a distiller who opened the H. E. Pogue Distillery in 1876 near the residence his son would later purchase. The distillery was a large scale operation which could produce up to 2,000 gallons of whiskey per day and carried a normal inventory of 15,000 barrels of aging whiskey. At its peak, distillery employment was more than 100. Popular brands around the start of the 20th century included "Old Time" Sour Mash Pure Whiskey and "Belle of Maysville" Fire Copper Whiskey. Henry E. Pogue II ran the distillery until his death in 1918 in a distillery accident.

References

National Register of Historic Places in Mason County, Kentucky
Houses on the National Register of Historic Places in Kentucky
Houses completed in 1845
Houses in Maysville, Kentucky
1845 establishments in Kentucky
Greek Revival architecture in Kentucky